Bounced Checks is the first compilation of Tom Waits recordings, including album, live and alternate versions of songs from six of his seven albums for Asylum Records, excepting his debut, Closing Time.

The collection includes several previously unreleased tracks.  "Mr. Henry" is an outtake from Heartattack and Vine, "The Piano Has Been Drinking" is a live rendition of the track from Small Change, and "Jersey Girl" and "Whistlin' Past the Graveyard" are alternate takes from Heartattack and Vine and Blue Valentine.

Track listing
Songs written by Tom Waits.

 "Heartattack and Vine" – 4:42
 "Jersey Girl" (alternate master) – 4:35
 "Eggs and Sausage (In a Cadillac with Susan Michelson)" – 4:14
 "I Never Talk to Strangers" (Duet with Bette Midler) – 3:36
 "The Piano Has Been Drinking" (recorded live - Dublin, Ireland, March 1981) – 6:04
 "Whistlin' Past the Graveyard" (alternate master) – 3:00
 "Mr. Henry" (previously unreleased) – 3:33
 "Diamonds on My Windshield" – 3:13
 "Burma Shave" – 6:28
 "Tom Traubert's Blues" – 6:21

Charts

References

1981 compilation albums
Tom Waits compilation albums
Asylum Records compilation albums
Albums produced by Bones Howe